Demons is a 2017 horror film written, directed, produced by Miles Doleac. The film also stars Doleac along with Lindsay Anne Williams, Steven Brand, Andrew Divoff, John Schneider, Gary Grubbs, Kristina Emerson, and Jessica Harthcock.

Plot 

Eight years ago, Father Colin Hampstead presided over an aborted exorcism that resulted in the gruesome death of seventeen-year-old Jewel Grant, in rural Louisiana. The deceased girl’s older sister, Kayleigh, grew immediately attached to Hampstead and sought him out, at first for grief counseling and then, for more. The once-zealous Father Hampstead soon left the priesthood, disillusioned with religion, but comforted by his love for Kayleigh. Colin and Kayleigh marry, but, on the night of their wedding, Kayleigh has a vision of her dead sister.

Now, Colin Hampstead has become a celebrated fiction writer, specializing in stories about the occult. He and Kayleigh have a daughter, and run a well-known bed and breakfast in Savannah, Georgia. When the couple agrees to host the wedding of one of Colin’s old friends, what begins as a jovial reunion turns into something much more macabre, as the seemingly omnipresent ghost of Kayleigh’s sister Jewel compels Kayleigh to engage in bizarre, destructive behaviors that endanger the lives of both her friends and herself.  Told in two timelines, past and present, the film slowly unravels the unsettling circumstances of Jewel’s death, while tracing Kayleigh’s struggle to understand why her sister haunts her.

Cast 
 Kristina Emerson as Lara
 Miles Doleac as Colin
 John Schneider as Dr. Gerry Connor
 Lindsay Anne Williams as Kayleigh
 Andrew Divoff as Jasper Grant
 Gary Grubbs as Father Joseph Moran
 Jessica Harthcock as Jewel Grant
 Steven Brand as Eddie 
 Yohance Myles as Marcus
 Ella Claire Bennett as Jewel Hampstead
 Megan Few as Emmie
 Presley Richardson as Young Jewel
 Caroline Baggerly as Caroline Grant
 Anna Voynik as Young Kayleigh
 Joseph VanZandt as Police Officer

Release
Demons was the first horror movie from Historia Films. It had a limited theatrical release, coupled with day-and-date streaming release on October 6, 2017.

Reception 
Demons received mostly mixed reviews from critics, although Noel Murray of the Los Angeles Times had this to say:  "The ambitious auteur is getting better at making his novelistic ideas punchy and cinematic, but "Demons" is still a B-movie that takes itself too seriously ... Still, Doleac's forging a niche. His name on a picture is now an indication that genre fans will see something different..." Charlotte Hollingsworth at Morbidly Beautiful wrote "Overall, Demons is an excellent film that brings something fresh to the exorcism genre."

References

External links
 

2017 films
2017 horror films
American supernatural horror films
Demons in film
Films about Catholic priests
Religious horror films
2010s English-language films
2010s American films